Emanuele Valeri (born 7 December 1998) is an Italian professional footballer who plays as a defender for  club Cremonese.

Club career
He spent the first several seasons of his senior career in lower Italian divisions.

On 10 September 2020, he signed with Serie B club Cremonese. He made his Serie B debut for Cremonese on 27 September 2020 in a game against Cittadella. He substituted Alessandro Crescenzi in the 60th minute. He made his first start on 17 October against Venezia.

References

External links
 

Living people
1998 births
Italian footballers
Footballers from Rome
Association football defenders
Serie A players
Serie B players
Serie C players
Serie D players
F.C. Rieti players
U.S. Lecce players
Cesena F.C. players
U.S. Cremonese players